Plesiopterys (“plesio” meaning “near,” and “pterys” meaning “wing” or “pterygoid bone”) is an extinct genus of plesiosaur originating from the Posidonienschiefer of Holzmaden, Germany, and lived during the Early Jurassic period. It is thought to be the sister taxon to all other plesiosauroids including the Plesiosaurus, and is placed outside of the Plesiosauroidea group. Plesiopterys wildi is the one known species within the genus, and is 220 centimeters long, or about 7.2 feet, and its body and skull are both relatively small. It possesses a unique combination of both primitive and derived characters, and is currently displayed at the State Museum of Natural History, Germany.

Geology and Paleoenvironment 
The Plesiopterys wildi specimen SMNS 16812 (Stattliches Museum für Naturkunde, Stuttgart, Germany) was discovered in Posidonienshifer, an area near Holzmaden, Germany, and is from the Lower Toarcian. This area is well known for fossil finds of sauropterygians, and is divided into four main zones: Suebian-Franconian, Yorkshire, Luxembourgian, and Norman. The zonation of the area can be used to interpret the distribution of plesiosaurs from the Early Jurassic, as each species is sorted into their respective zones.

The Posidonienshifer, also known as the Posidonia Shale, has yielded a great number of specimens, most abundantly ichthyosaurs and plesiosaurians. Plesiopterys wildi is accompanied by a few other taxa found in the Holzmaden area, including M. brachypterygius and Hauffiosaurus. The Posidonia Shale is a part of a series of organically rich black shales deposited in the Southwest German Basin (SWGB), and the SWGB itself is a part of a larger series of basins in central Europe called the Central European epicontinental Basins (CEBs). These early Toarcian CEBs were shallow transcontinental seas that tended to be less than 150 meters deep, and occasionally connected the Proto-North Atlantic region to the north, and connected the Tethys region to the southern region. The conditions of the water tended to fluctuate between anoxic and oxygen rich depending on different environmental states, and thus the total organic content (TOC), along with the amount of fossils found, fluctuated between anoxic bottom conditions and a more composite benthic environment. For example, during the late Pliensbachian regression, abundant winds and waves caused mixing of the water, resulting in increased oxygen levels for a short period (as evidenced by thin bioturbated marls), bringing about high benthic diversity. Afterwards, however, TOC decreased and benthic diversity increased soon after. Benthic scavenging due to fluctuating oxygen levels is what results in the lower quality preserved fossils, but better preservation is due to higher benthic oxygen levels with a sedimentation rate optimal for fossil preservation. It is notable that other fauna containing primitive characters have also been found at the Holzmaden site.

Discovery 
The Plesiopterys wildi specimen was discovered around August of 1893 by a local slate dealer in the Haurr slate pit. This slate is from the lower division of the upper Lias, and the zone of the Posidonia Bronni Oppel’s. The slate dealer offered the specimen to the local Royal Museum of Natural History for sale, and H. W. Dames, a paleontologist, was commissioned by the government to inspect the specimen and give his opinions and analysis. At that time, the only plesiosaur fossils that had been discovered in Germany were small fragments or individual vertebrae, which made this specimen, in Dames’ words, a “first-rate showpiece.” The original owner of the specimen had already been preparing the specimen for three months in such a way that half of the skull was exposed on the underside. Coincidentally, another fantastically preserved specimen of Ichthyosaurus biscissus was uncovered around the same time, so the ruler of Germany at the time decided the two be inspected together. Additionally, he approved that Plesiopterys wildi be introduced into the scientific community as “Guilelmi imperatoris.” This term is no longer used, nor are the other synonyms, and “Plesiopterys wildi” is the correct name for this specimen. Because information about Plesiosaurs was extremely limited at the time, Dames requested to have relevant specimens sent to him by directors of several paleontological collections so that he could perform a proper inspection and description.

Description and Paleobiology

Classification 
Plesiosaurs are classified into two main morphotypes: the Pliosauromorphs (Plesiosauria/plesiosaur) and the Plesiosauromorphs (Pliosauroidea/pliosauroid). Pliosauromorphs have a short neck and a large head, while Plesiosauromorphs have a long neck and a small head. A new stem-based definition have been proposed to replace the old classification system - the term Neoplesiosauria refers to the Plesiosauroidea and the Pliosauroidea clades. Plesiopterys wildi is a sister taxa to Plesiosauroidea.

Description 
Plesiopterys wildi is a relatively short plesiosaur that is mounted at 220 cm with a relatively small head and body, its limbs and limb girdles being similar in proportion to other plesiosaurs. It has 39 neck vertebrae; by comparison, Plesiosaurus has 27 neck vertebrae, but because each individual vertebrae of Plesiopterys is shorter, it has a longer neck than Plesiosaurus, though its general morphology and proportions are more similar to Thalassiodracon. In addition to 39 cervical vertebrae, Plesiopterys also has 23 dorsal vertebrae, 3 sacral vertebrae and, and 41 caudal vertebrae. Plesiopterys retains specialized grooves on the dorsal side of the pterygoid for attachment of the internal carotid artery, a feature that is not observed in Plesiosaurs. 

The SMNS 16812 specimen is thought to be a young adult due to the visible sutures between the centra and neural arch on the cervical vertebrae. Further confirmation of its adult age comes from the ossification states of other skeletal elements.

Skull 
The skull of specimen SMNS 16812, while well preserved, has a rather crushed skull, with multiple skeletal elements having been broken off, rotated, or otherwise obliterated. On the premaxilla, four or five alveoli are present, along with five premaxillary teeth, which is a plesiomorphic feature for plesiosaurs. Its skull is intermediary between the more primitive Thalassiodracon and the more derived Plesiosaurus.

The pterygoids are unique in that they possess grooves on the dorsal surface, and extend within the posterior interpterygoid vacuities and the pterygoid covering of the ventral surface of the basisphenoid. There has been some debate regarding the interpretations of the location of the suture between the vomer and the pterygoid, but it is most likely located at the anterior end of the anterior interpterygoid vacuity. This anterior interpterygoid vacuity is rather large, and is bigger than those in Thalassiodracon, Rhomaleosaurus, and Leptocleidus. The large anterior interpterygoid vacuity is not a general autapomorphy. The pterygoid possess thin flanges and extend within the posterior interpterygoid vacuities, and the pterygoid covering of the ventral surface of the basisphenoid. Furthermore, there is no visible suture between the flanges and the quadrate rami of the pterygoids. Dorsally, the thin pterygoid surface displays paired grooves that are oriented posterolateral to anteromedial. This feature is unlike those seen in any known plesiosaur, and is similar to the closed palate on nothosaurs. The cultriform process of the parasphenoid divides the pterygoids, extending towards the posterior end of the anterior interpterygoid vacuity, and is rather narrow. Unlike other early plesiosaurs, there is no evidence of a structure for articulation for a quadrate, but that may be due to degradation.

The mandible retains a prominent mandibular ridge, unlike the rest of plesiosaurids, which have lost the feature. Akin to Plesiosaurus, Plesiopterys has a simple and unreinforced lower jaw symphysis. Unfortunately, the rest of the mandibular elements of SMNS 16812 are too crushed to identify, so no further significant features could be identified.

The braincase of SMNS 16812 is similarly obstructed, being dislocated from the rest of the skull. However, the exoccipital/opisthotics, basioccipital, and the supraoccipital elements are similar to that seen in Thalassiodracon.

Postcranium 
The postcranium of Plesiopterys contains 39 cervical vertebrae, which is greater than the plesiomorphic number of about 30-32 cervical vertebrae. The neck length of Plesiopterys suggests that it is likely transitional in terms of neck morphology compared to Plesiosaurs. The neural arches do not have zygosphene-zygantrum articulations and are shorter than the vertebral centra, which is a state shared with plesiosaurians. The centra themselves are about the same width and length. The humerus is also similar to the plesiosaurian type; it is angled so that the anterior end is angled for articulation with the radius, and the posterior end for the articulation with the ulna. This further suggests that it is in an adult stage.

Locomotion and Lifestyle 
Previous interpretations of the plesiosaur morphologies have modeled it as more flexible and dynamic, but recent studies have shown that they are quite stiff and rigid. Many features contribute to its ability to swim well underwater, and models have been made to assess its locomotion. They have well-ossified wrists and ankles, and their digits are tightly packed together to support strong, intense swimming. They swam by “flying” - by flapping or rotating their limbs, so that they soared through the water similar to how a bird does in the air, in a motion that is partially lift-based. Though their flipper-like limbs were the primary appendage used for their propulsion under the water, it has been proposed that their tails may have also contributed to their propulsion to some extent as well. Analyses have also been conducted to deduce the exact form of swimming that plesiosauromorphs and pliosauromorphs would have performed. This was done by calculating a certain value called the AR value, or the Aspect Ratio, of a variety of flight-capable animals and machines, and using the data to interpret Plesiosaur AR. A lower AR corresponds to maneuverability and pursuit, while a higher AR corresponds to a much higher efficiency for traveling long distances. Flight AR is thus a trade off between maneuverability and efficiency. Flight with higher maneuverability is less efficient in terms of energy, while flight with more efficiency has a slower flight speed and produces more drag. In short, pliosauromorphs (short neck, large head) have a low AR (high maneuverability), and plesiosauromorphs (long neck, small head) have a high AR (high efficiency). It is thought that high AR is the more primitive condition.

Plesiosaurs from the Toarcian have been found that suggest an invertebrate diet and migratory behavior, and larger wing area. The preservation of soft tissue and phosphatised collagen fibers indicate that the surface area of the wing may be larger than the skeletal area alone. The sand found inside of the specimen indicated that its habit could have consisted of shallower waters than where the specimen was discovered, as well as lived in benthic waters, so it likely preyed on invertebrates and exhibited migratory behavior. Its stomach contents suggest that it likely preyed on bottom-dwelling creatures, as opposed to feasting on fish plucked from passing shoals as originally believed (O’Keefe 2009).

See also

 List of plesiosaur genera
 Timeline of plesiosaur research

References

Jurassic plesiosaurs
Fossils of Germany
Cryptoclidids
Early Jurassic plesiosaurs of Europe
Fossil taxa described in 2004
Sauropterygian genera

Plesiosaurs
Posidonia Shale
Posidonia